Kirkfield/Balsam Lake Aerodrome  is located  southeast of Kirkfield and just west of Balsam Lake, Ontario, Canada. The base is operated by Brian Freymond, who also runs Kirkfield/Balsam Lake Seaplane Base.

References

Registered aerodromes in Ontario